Jewels 5th Ring was a mixed martial arts (MMA) event held by MMA promotion Jewels.

Background
Jewels announced on  that Jewels 5th Ring would take placed at Shinjuku Face, headlining South Korean fighter and Deep veteran Seo Hee Ham against Misaki Takimoto and with the first Rough Stone Grand Prix tournament with three weight classes. On , Jewels added former Smackgirl champion Megumi Yabushita and German fighter Alexandra Sanchez to the card. Kikuyo Ishikawa was originally set to face Mami Odera as part of Rough Stone GP, but Odera got injured and Ishikawa participated in a normal bout instead of the tournament.

Results

See also
 Jewels (mixed martial arts)
 2009 in Jewels

References

External links
Official results at Jewels 
Event results at Sherdog
Event results at Fightergirls.com
Event results  at Bout Review 
Event results at God Bless the Ring 
Event results at kakutoh.com 
Event results at sportsnavi.com 

Jewels (mixed martial arts) events
2009 in mixed martial arts
Mixed martial arts in Japan
Sports competitions in Tokyo
2009 in Japanese sport